Péter Balassa (born 18 March 1975) is a Hungarian football player and politician. Balassa retired at end of 2008–2009 season, he became a Member of Parliament in 2022.

Balassa has played in the Hungarian NB I for Videoton FC Fehérvár during the 2000–01 season.

Haladas
From 2005 to 2008, he has spent 3 seasons with Szombathelyi Haladás appearing in 57 matches and scoring 10 goals for the Szombathely-based team in the NB II; and in the season 2007/08, he managed to win the NB II and hence, Haladas was promoted to the NB I for the 2008/09 season.

Honours
Hungarian second division:  Winner: 2007/08

References

External links
Profile at HLSZ.hu 

1975 births
Living people
People from Sárvár
Hungarian footballers
Association football defenders
Szombathelyi Haladás footballers
Püspökmolnári KSK footballers
Keszthely FC footballers
Körmend FC footballers
Debreceni VSC players
Fehérvár FC players
Jobbik MEPs